The Volunteer Combatant's Medal 1914–1918 was a Belgian wartime service medal established by royal decree on 17 June 1930 and awarded to Belgian citizens and foreign nationals  who voluntarily enlisted for service in the Belgian Armed Forces during World War I.

Award statute
The Volunteer Combatant's Medal 1914–1918 was awarded for voluntary enlistment and service in a combat unit in a danger zone for not less than 6 months during the First World War.  Later, the eligibility criteria were extended to include volunteers, older than 40 years of age who had served for 3 months in a combat unit in a danger zone, who were older than 50 years of age who had served for 1 month in a combat unit in a danger zone, and medical personnel who had served for 2 years in non-occupied Belgium.  Additional provisions were made regarding awards to youngsters who had fled occupied Belgium and persons who were wounded in action, and posthumous awards.

Award description
The Volunteer Combatant's Medal 1914–1918 was a 36 mm in diameter bronze circular medal topped with a crescent shaped (30 mm at its base) section giving it a nearly oval shape of a height of 50 mm.  On its obverse at right front, the relief image of the head of a helmeted First World War Belgian soldier facing left, to his left and partially hidden behind him, the relief image of the head of an 1830 volunteer also facing left and wearing a bonnet typically worn by the revolutionaries.  The crescent section bears the relief image of the Belgian crown over laurel branches.  On the reverse, along the outer circumference, the Latin inscription "VOLUNTARIIS PATRIA MEMOR", in the center, the years 1914–1918.

The medal was suspended by a ring through the suspension loop to a silk moiré royal blue ribbon.

Notable recipients (partial list)
The individuals listed below were awarded the Volunteer Combatant's Medal 1914–1918:
Cavalry Lieutenant General Marcel Jooris
Major General Maurice Jacmart
Lieutenant General Jean-Baptiste Piron
Cavalry Major General Baron Beaudoin de Maere d’Aertrycke
Major General Lucien Van Hoof
Major General Norbert Stroobants
Count Gatien du Parc Locmaria
Baron Joseph van der Elst
Jacques Delvaux de Fenffe
Count Hubert Pierlot
August de Schryver
Baron Raoul Richard
Count Georges Moens de Fernig
Pierre Ryckmans
Count Adelin d’Oultremont de Wégimont et de Warfusée
Count Louis Cornet d’Elzius de Ways Ruart
Baron Robert Goffinet
Viscount Jacques Davignon
Count Louis d’Ursel

See also

 List of Orders, Decorations and Medals of the Kingdom of Belgium

References

Other sources
 Quinot H., 1950, Recueil illustré des décorations belges et congolaises, 4e Edition. (Hasselt)
 Cornet R., 1982, Recueil des dispositions légales et réglementaires régissant les ordres nationaux belges. 2e Ed. N.pl.,  (Brussels)
 Borné A.C., 1985, Distinctions honorifiques de la Belgique, 1830–1985 (Brussels)

External links
Les Ordres Nationaux Belges (In French)
Bibliothèque royale de Belgique (In French)
ARS MORIENDI Notables from Belgian history (In French and Dutch)

Voluntary Combatant 1914-1918, Medal of the
1930 establishments in Belgium
Awards established in 1930